Flicka Ricka Dicka is the name of fictional triplets depicted in a series of children's books by author/illustrator Maj Lindman.
The triplets, all girls with blond hair, live in Sweden and have light hearted misadventures. The series of books were first created in the 1920s in Sweden and then printed in English in the United States from the 1930s. Lindman also authored a series a books about three boys, Snipp, Snapp, Snurr along a similar theme.  A 1936 New York Times review of the book Snipp Snapp Snurr and the Yellow Sled cited the Snipp, Snapp, Snurr series as "popular with the little children".

The series of books continued until about 1960. Some of Lindman's stories were included in a series of compilations called "The Best of Children's Books".

Books (incomplete) 
Flicka Ricka Dicka and Their New Skates
Flicka Ricka Dicka and the Three Kittens
Flicka Ricka Dicka and the New Dotted Dresses
Flicka Ricka Dicka Bake a Cake
Flicka Ricka Dicka and the Little Dog
Flicka Ricka Dicka and the Strawberries
Flicka Ricka Dicka Go to Market
Flicka Ricka Dicka and the Big Red Hen
Flicka Ricka Dicka and Their New Friend
Flicka Ricka Dicka and the Girl Next Door

See also
 Moomin

References

External links

 

Picture books
Swedish children's literature
Fictional triplets
Series of children's books